Lofton Reservoir, also known locally as None, is an earthen impoundment of water located  above sea level in Lake County, Oregon, United States. Construction was completed in 1962. It is owned by Oregon Department of Fish and Wildlife.

Statistics
and a  drainage basin.

Fauna
Rainbow trout and brook trout are common in the lake.

Recreation
Lofton Reservoir has a pack it in-pack it out campground located around the lake. Popular activities include fishing and boating limited to electric motors.

See also
 List of lakes in Oregon

References

Reservoirs in Oregon
Lakes of Lake County, Oregon
Buildings and structures in Lake County, Oregon
Fremont–Winema National Forest
1962 establishments in Oregon